Henry Owen Dresser (October 2, 1891 – November 10, 1963) was an American football and baseball player and coach. He served as the head baseball coach at the University of Vermont in 1928 and the head football coach at Shippensburg University of Pennsylvania from 1929 to 1932, compiling a record of 16–16–1.

Dresser was later a professor of health and physical education at Louisiana State University (LSU). He died on November 10, 1963, in Baton Rouge, Louisiana.

References

External links
 

1891 births
1963 deaths
American football quarterbacks
Kansas State Wildcats football players
Shippensburg Red Raiders football coaches
Springfield Pride football players
Vermont Catamounts baseball coaches
Vermont Catamounts football coaches
Louisiana State University faculty
Sportspeople from Manhattan, Kansas